was a  after Tengi and before Jiryaku. This period spanned the years from August 1058 through August 1065.

Change of era
 1058   : The new era name was created to mark an event or series of events. The previous era ended and the new one commenced in Tengi 6, on the 29th day of the 8th month of 1058.

Events of the Kōhei era
 1060 (Kōhei 3, 27th day of the 11th month): A broom star was observed in the south for seven nights.

Notes

References
 Brown, Delmer M. and Ichirō Ishida, eds. (1979).  Gukanshō: The Future and the Past. Berkeley: University of California Press. ;  OCLC 251325323
 Nussbaum, Louis-Frédéric and Käthe Roth. (2005).  Japan encyclopedia. Cambridge: Harvard University Press. ;  OCLC 58053128
 Pankenier, David W., Zhentao Xu and Yaotiao Jiang. (2008). Archaeoastronomy in East Asia: Historical Observational Records of Comets and Meteor Showers from China, Japan, and Korea. Amherst, New York: Cambria Press.  ;  OCLC 269455845
 Titsingh, Isaac. (1834). Nihon Odai Ichiran; ou,  Annales des empereurs du Japon.  Paris: Royal Asiatic Society, Oriental Translation Fund of Great Britain and Ireland. OCLC 5850691
 Varley, H. Paul. (1980). A Chronicle of Gods and Sovereigns: Jinnō Shōtōki of Kitabatake Chikafusa. New York: Columbia University Press. ;  OCLC 6042764

External links
 National Diet Library, "The Japanese Calendar" -- historical overview plus illustrative images from library's collection

Japanese eras